Marathi cinema is an Indian film industry of Marathi-language motion pictures. It is based in Mumbai,Pune Maharashtra. Film  Production  in   Mumbai, Pune. It is the oldest film industry of Indian cinema. The first Marathi film to be released in India was Shree Pundalik by Dadasaheb Torne on 18 May 1912 at Coronation Cinematograph, Mumbai. and a Marathi crew who were performing Marathi and Sanskrit  (musicals) and plays in Marathi at that period.

The first Marathi talkie film, Ayodhyecha Raja, was released in 1932, just one year after Alam Ara the first Hindi talkie. Although the industry is much smaller than Hindi cinema (which is also primarily based in Mumbai), Marathi cinema is tax free at the privilege of the state of Maharashtra, and is experiencing growth in recent years. Raja Harishchandra, directed by Dadasaheb Phalke, was a Marathi film, now known as India's first full-length feature, released in 1913. The Dadasaheb Phalke Award is India's highest award in cinema given annually by the Government of Maharashtra for lifetime contribution to Indian cinema.

History

Silent movies period

Marathi cinema is the oldest form of Indian cinema. The first Marathi movie released in India was Shree Pundalik by Dadasaheb Torne on 18 May 1912 at Coronation Cinematograph, Mumbai.

Dadasaheb Phalke is known as the first pioneer and founder of cinema in pre-Independence India. He brought the revolution of moving images to India with his first indigenously made film Raja Harishchandra in 1913, which is considered by IFFI and NIFD as part of Marathi cinema as it used Marathi dialogues while shooting and had a fully Marathi crew. Kolhapur in Western Maharashtra was another centre of active film production in the twenties. In 1919 Baburao Mistry — popularly known as Baburao Painter — formed the Maharashtra Film Company with the blessings of the Maharaja of Kolhapur and released the first significant historical Sairandhari (1920) with Balasheb Pawar, Kamala Devi and Zunzarrao Pawar in stellar roles. Because of his special interest in sets, costumes, design and painting, he chose episodes from Maratha history for interpreting in the new medium and specialized in the historical genre. Baburao Painter made many silent movies till 1930. However, after a few more silent films, the Maharashtra Film Company pulled down its shutters with the advent of sound. Baburao was not particularly keen on the talkies for he believed that they would destroy the visual culture so painfully evolved over the years.

After advent of sound
As cinema grew in Union of India, major production houses rose and one of them was again a company owned wholly by Maharashtrians, the Prabhat Film Company. Prabhat's Sant Tukaram was the first Indian work to win the Best Film Award at the Venice film festival in 1937.
In 1954 at the very first edition of the National Awards, Shyamchi Aai another Marathi film, won the first President's gold medal for Cinema. It was directed by Acharya P K Atre, and it was an adaptation of the eponymous novel by Sane Guruji.

The Golden era

Marathi cinema was in its full bloom by this time with the advent of greats like V. Shantaram, Master Vinayak, Bhalji Pendharkar, Acharya Atre, followed by Raja Paranjpe, Jyotiram, sonal and mumtaz, Dinkar D Patil, G. D. Madgulkar, Sudhir Phadke, Raja Thakur . The 1960s saw the emergence of directors like Anant Mane who made Marathi films based on the folk art form Tamasha. Then came directors like Datta Dharmadhikari and Raj Dutt who made traditional family dramas. The early 70s saw the advent of Dada Kondke who captured the audiences with his sense of humour that included sexual innuendo. He went on to create satirical, pun-ridden films often including social and political commentary, many of which became cult classics. By this time Marathi cinema was caught in either the Tamasha genre or tragedies revolving around traditional family dramas on one side and the comedies of Dada Kondke.

1980s

The 1980s saw two comedy heroes catapult to stardom, Ashok Saraf and Laxmikant Berde. Around the mid-80s two young actors donned the director's mantle: Mahesh Kothare and Sachin Pilgaonkar. Pilgaonkar directed Navri Mile Navryala and around the same time Mahesh Kothare directed Dhumdhadaka. Pilgaonkar's film was a box-office hit while Mahesh Kothare's became a mega hit at the box-office, became a trend-setter, and brought young audiences to Marathi cinema. Mahesh Kothare went on to make comedy films that became major hits. He made the first Marathi film shot on the anamorphic format (Cinemascope) — Dhadakebaaz.

Reasons for the decline of Marathi cinema
While the theatre of Maharashtra earned recognition at the national level, the cinema failed to make a mark. A major reason was the proximity to the production centre of Hindi cinema (Bollywood), which encroached on the identity of Marathi cinema. Other reasons include the shortage of cinema halls for distribution due to poor marketing, lack of money magnets, a vibrant theatre scene and the emergence of private television. It also lacked the powerful lobby at the national level unlike South Indian cinema because the state encouraged Hindi cinema for profit mainly; the regional film industrial advantage being soaked up by Bollywood.

Revival: Marathi New Wave
In past few years, the Marathi cinema industry has produced many films that are not only critically acclaimed but commercially successful as well.

Acclaimed director Dr Jabbar Patel explains the reasons behind the change, "The kind of Marathi cinema that is being made today is very fresh and different. This is thanks to directors and writers getting exposed to world cinema via television, film festivals etc. They are coming up with new storylines and innovative concepts."

With outstanding contribution and efforts from different producers and directors of the Mumbai film industry, Marathi cinema relatively outshined other Indian film industries such as Bollywood in the first quarter of 2010 in box office collections and critical appreciation.

Actor-director Mahesh Kothare brought a number of innovations in the technical quality of Marathi films and was the first to bring Dolby Digital sound to Marathi cinema with Chimni Pakhara in 2003. He made the first Marathi film with Digital Special Effects, Pachadlela, in 2004. He also made first Marathi movie in 3D Zapatlela 2, in 2013.

Contemporary
Marathi cinema received critical acclaim in 2004 with the film Shwaas winning the Golden Lotus National Award. It was India's official entry to the 77th Academy Awards. It won the President's medal for best film, beating Bollywood's prolific output with quality. Shwaas was the second Marathi film to win the President's Medal after Shyamchi Aai (1950).

The Maharashtra state government has begun to issue grants to Marathi film (between 1.5 million and 3.0 million rupees). After the success of Shwaas, Indian media players like Shringar Films and Zee Telefilms are exhibiting a re-emerging interest in Marathi cinema. The growing popularity of Marathi television (notably Zee Marathi, ETV Marathi, Mi Marathi, Star Pravah, Saam TV) has helped to popularize older Marathi cinema and promote the genre. Zee Talkies and Shemaroo MarathiBana a 24-hour channel dedicated to Marathi movies, has been introduced.

In 2009, Marathi film Harishchandrachi Factory (with a budget of Rs. 6 crore), depicting the struggle of Dadasaheb Phalke in making Raja Harishchandra in 1913, India's first feature film, directed by theatre-veteran Paresh Mokashi was selected as India's official entry to Academy Award in the Best Foreign Language Film category, making it the second Marathi film, after Shwaas, to receive this honour.

2009 saw the blockbuster musical movie Natarang, which both commercial and critical applause and has served as a path-breaking movie for Marathi cinema.

Since the new decade beginning in 2010, several contemporary Marathi artistic films released including Umesh Vinayak Kulkarni's Vihir and Deool, and Nagraj Manjule's Fandry. They have given a new direction to Marathi films.

Deool became the third movie after Shyaamchi Aai and Shwaas to win the National Film Award for Best Feature Film

Sairat (2016) musical romantic drama starring Rinku Rajguru and Akash Thosar, directed by Nagraj Manjule and produced by Nagraj Manjule, Nitin Keni, and Nikhil Sane emerged as the biggest weekend opener for a Marathi film breaking record previously held by Natsamrat. Sairat was the first Marathi film to cross ₹50 crore (US$7.8 million) mark. The film has become the first Marathi film to gross over ₹100 crore (US$16 million) worldwide. Also it ran for more than 100 days in many centres of Maharashtra.

Awards

Filmfare Awards

Maharashtra State Awards

Nowadays, Marathi movies have been listed at many international film festivals, which provides a platform for such movies and the filmmakers to know big in the world film industry. All Lights Film Services provided platform for Marathi films such as Pinky – Ek Sathyakatha, Kapus Kondyachi Goshta, Hou De Jarasa Ushir, Sopanchi Aye Bahina Bhai, Touring Talkies, Langar to almost all leading international festivals across the world.

Highest Grossing Marathi Films

National Film Award

Further reading
 Marathi Cinema: In Retrospect, by Sanjit Narwekar. Maharashtra Film, Stage & Cultural Development Corp., 1995.

See also

 List of Marathi films
 List of Marathi film actresses
Sayali Sanjeev Chandsarkar

References

 
Culture of Maharashtra